José Maldonado González (12 November 1900, in Tineo, Asturias – 11 February 1985, in Oviedo) was the last president of the Spanish Republican government in Exile. Elected in the 1936 Spanish general election as a deputy for Oviedo province, he was a member of the Republican Left party, which formed part of the Popular Front. In 1938, several months before the end of the Spanish Civil War and the fall of the Second Spanish Republic, Maldonado fled to France.

Already in exile, Maldonado held positions in many parts of the notional Republican government, such as Minister of Justice (1949–1951) and Minister of Justice and Information (1962–1971). 

At a more practical level, Maldonado lived in Paris and held a variety of teaching jobs. He was also active as a 
Freemason.

In 1970 he succeeded Luis Jiménez de Asúa as President of the Republic in exile. In 1977 he recognized the elections in Spain and agreed on ceasing international relations, in accordance with the president José López Portillo of Mexico.

References

Offices and titles

1900 births
1985 deaths
People from Tineo
Radical Socialist Republican Party politicians
Republican Left (Spain) politicians
Presidents of Spain
Government ministers of Spain
Members of the Congress of Deputies of the Second Spanish Republic
Politicians from Asturias
Spanish people of the Spanish Civil War (Republican faction)
Exiles of the Spanish Civil War in France
Exiled Spanish politicians